Isani Vaghela (born 7 January 2006) is an American cricketer who plays for the United States women's national cricket team. Her brother, Vatsal, also plays international cricket for the United States.

In September 2021, Vaghela was named in the American Women's Twenty20 International (WT20I) team for the 2021 ICC Women's T20 World Cup Americas Qualifier tournament in Mexico. She made her WT20I debut on 18 October 2021, in the opening match of the tournament against Brazil. The following month, she was also named in America's squad for the 2021 Women's Cricket World Cup Qualifier tournament in Zimbabwe. On 23 November 2021, she played in America's first match of the tournament, against Bangladesh.

In August 2022, she was signed as an overseas player for Guyana Amazon Warriors for the inaugural edition of the Women's Caribbean Premier League.

References

External links

2006 births
Living people
People from Milpitas, California
American women cricketers
United States women Twenty20 International cricketers
Cricketers from California
American sportspeople of Indian descent
Guyana Amazon Warriors (WCPL) cricketers